"The Shah Is Gone" is a headline that appeared on the front cover of the Iranian newspaper Ettela'at on Tuesday, 16 January 1979, when the Shah left Iran, a few days before the fall of the Pahlavi dynasty and the 2500-year-old Iranian monarchy. The title contains the word shah (king) instead of shahanshah (king of kings) to refer to Mohammad Reza Pahlavi, which was very rare during his reign. It is described as the "most famous headline in the history of Iran".

See also 
Iranian Revolution

References 

Headlines
Iranian Revolution
Mohammad Reza Pahlavi